Dorlisheim is a commune in the Bas-Rhin department in Grand Est in north-eastern France.

Economy
The headquarters of Bugatti Automobiles is located at the Château Saint-Jean just outside Dorlisheim.

See also
 Communes of the Bas-Rhin department

References

External links

 Commune de Dorlisheim - official website (in French)

Communes of Bas-Rhin
Bas-Rhin communes articles needing translation from French Wikipedia